Houck is an unincorporated community in Cape Girardeau County, in the U.S. state of Missouri.

History
A post office called Houck was established in 1886, and remained in operation until 1906. The community most likely derives its name from Abraham and Peter Houk, owners of the site.

References

Unincorporated communities in Cape Girardeau County, Missouri
Unincorporated communities in Missouri